Whitner Nutting Bissell (October 25, 1909 – March 5, 1996) was an American character actor.

Early life
Born in New York City, Bissell was the son of surgeon Dr. J. Dougal Bissell and Helen Nutting Bissell. He was educated at the Allen-Stevenson School and the Dalton School in New York City. He was related to Daniel Bissell, who was awarded the Badge of Military Merit, the predecessor of the Purple Heart, by George Washington.

He trained with the Carolina Playmakers, a theatrical organization associated with the University of North Carolina at Chapel Hill, where he majored in drama and English.

Career
Bissell had a number of roles in Broadway theatre, including the Air Force show Winged Victory, when he was an airman serving in the United States Army Air Forces.

In a film career that began with Holy Matrimony (1943), Bissell appeared in hundreds of films and television episodes as a prominent character actor. Regularly cast in low-budget science fiction and horror films, his roles include a mad scientist in the film I Was a Teenage Werewolf (1957) and Professor Frankenstein in I Was a Teenage Frankenstein (also 1957).

He played the attending psychiatrist who treats the protagonist, Dr. Miles Bennell, played by Kevin McCarthy, in Invasion of the Body Snatchers (1956) and appeared in Creature from the Black Lagoon (1954).

Bissell appeared as a guest star in many television drama series between the early 1950s and the mid-1970s, with more sporadic appearances after that. He guest-starred in a couple of episodes of The Lone Ranger. He appeared on other syndicated series, including Sheriff of Cochise, Whirlybirds, Peyton Place and The Brothers Brannagan. He was cast in the religion series Crossroads and Going My Way, and in the NBC education drama series Mr. Novak.

Bissell played murderer Larry Sands on CBS's Perry Mason ("The Case of the Crooked Candle", 1957), along with Max Pompey in "The Case of the Lavender Lipstick" (1960), Laurence Barlow in "The Case of the Nautical Knot" (1964) and Dennison Groody in "The Case of the Carefree Coronary" (1965). He appeared in an episode of Mr. Adams and Eve in 1957 and of Peter Gunn in 1958. He played different roles in multiple episodes of the ABC series The Rifleman, and as Sinclair Bruder in "The Great Guy" (1956) on Father Knows Best. 

Bissell portrayed the undertaker (who sees every man, no matter his race, as "just another future customer") in the film The Magnificent Seven (1960).

In 1960, Bissell had appeared in George Pal's production of The Time Machine, as Walter Kemp, one of the Time Traveller's dining friends. He also appeared in a 1978 TV movie adapting the H. G. Wells novel for a more modern setting. Bissell's Time Tunnel co-star John Zaremba also appeared in the telemovie. Thirty-three years later, in 1993 the documentary film Time Machine: The Journey Back (which featured Bissell, Rod Taylor and Alan Young), Bissell recreated his 1960 role as Walter in the opening sequence. It was Bissell's last acting performance.

From 1959 to 1961, Bissell was a regular for the third and fourth seasons of the television series Bachelor Father, costarring John Forsythe, Noreen Corcoran, and Sammee Tong. He appeared in an episode of Straightaway in 1961. He was cast three times on the long-running NBC western series The Virginian.

Bissell played General Heywood Kirk in 30 episodes in the 1966–1967 season of the science-fiction television series The Time Tunnel. He often played silver-haired figures of authority, here as in many other roles (as described by AllMovie), "instantly establishing his standard screen characterization of fussy officiousness", leavened in many instances with a military bearing. Other examples of such authoritative roles as military or police officials, include appearances in The Caine Mutiny, The Manchurian Candidate, The Outer Limits (1963), Hogan's Heroes (1966), and The Man from U.N.C.L.E. (1966). Bissell also appeared in the Barnaby Jones episode, "Murder in the Doll's House" (March 25, 1973). 

Bissell appeared in the classic episode "The Trouble with Tribbles" of Star Trek, footage of which was re-used in Star Trek: Deep Space Nines "Trials and Tribble-ations".

In 1978 and 1980, Bissell appeared in two episodes of The Incredible Hulk, first in the second-season episode "Kindred Spirits" as Professor Williams, and later as Professor John Zeiderman in the second part of the fourth season two-parter "Prometheus".

Bissell was a guest of honor at New York City's Tele-Fantasy Con 1975 on August 1 - 3, along with celebrities Noel Neill, Jim Danforth and Joseph Stefano, and spent the weekend meeting his fans and signing hundreds of autographs free of charge. He also received a life career award from the Academy of Science Fiction, Fantasy and Horror Films in 1994. He also served for many years on the board of directors of the Screen Actors Guild, and represented the actors' branch of the Academy of Motion Picture Arts and Sciences board of governors.

Personal life
Bissell was married three times and had three daughters (Kathy Marden, Victoria Brown and Amanda Whiteley) and a stepson, Brian Forster. Forster was the second actor to play the role of Chris Partridge on The Partridge Family TV series.

Wives:
 Adrienne Marden (November 23, 1938 – 1954; divorced); 2 children
 Dilys Mary Shan Jukes (December 5, 1954 – January 11, 1958; her death); 1 child
 Jennifer Raine (November 24, 1967 – January 5, 1993; her death)

Death
Bissell died on March 5, 1996 (aged 86) at the Motion Picture & Television Country House and Hospital in Woodland Hills, Los Angeles, California. He had suffered from Parkinson's disease. He was interred in the Westwood Village Memorial Park Cemetery in Los Angeles.

Broadway roles
 The Star-Wagon (1937) as Park
 The American Way (1939) as Karl
 Two On An Island (1940) Frederic Winthorp
 Cafe Crown (1942) as Walter
 Winged Victory (1943) as Lt. Jules Hudson

Selected filmography

The Sea Hawk (1940) as Gate Guard at Palace Entrance (uncredited)
Holy Matrimony (1943) as Harry Leek (uncredited)
Destination Tokyo (1943) as Yo Yo (uncredited)
Winged Victory (1944) as Lt. Hudson (uncredited)
The Horn Blows at Midnight (1945) as Heavenly Piccolo Player (uncredited)
Cluny Brown (1946) as Archie, Dowager's Son (uncredited)
Somewhere in the Night (1946) as John (uncredited)
It Shouldn't Happen to a Dog (1946) as Chester Frye (uncredited)
The Sea of Grass (1947) as Ted, the Clerk (uncredited)
Brute Force (1947) as Tom Lister
Night Song (1947) as Party Guest (uncredited)
A Double Life (1947) as Dr. Stauffer
The Senator Was Indiscreet (1947) as Oakes
Another Part of the Forest (1948) as Jugger
Raw Deal (1948) as Murderer
Canon City (1948) as Richard Heilman
That Lady in Ermine (1948) as Giulio
He Walked by Night (1948) as Paul Reeves
Chicken Every Sunday (1949) as Mr. Robinson / Robby
The Crime Doctor's Diary (1949) as Pete Bellem
Anna Lucasta (1949) as Stanley
Tokyo Joe (1949) as Capt. Winnow (uncredited)
And Baby Makes Three (1949) as Party Guest (uncredited)
Side Street (1949) as Harold Simpson
When Willie Comes Marching Home (1950) as Lt. M.J. Hanley — Psychiatrist (uncredited)
Perfect Strangers (1950) as Mr. Lister — Defense Attorney (uncredited)
Convicted (1950) as States Attorney Owens (uncredited)
A Life of Her Own (1950) as Rental Agent (uncredited)
Wyoming Mail (1950) as Sam
The Killer That Stalked New York (1950) as Sid Bennet
The Du Pont Story (1950) as Dr. Wallace Carothers
For Heaven's Sake (1950) as Doctor (uncredited)
The Great Missouri Raid (1951) as Bob Ford
The Red Badge of Courage (1951) as Wounded Officer (uncredited)
Tales of Robin Hood (1951) as Will Stutely
Sealed Cargo (1951) as Schuster (uncredited)
Night into Morning (1951) as Monument Salesman (uncredited)
Lost Continent (1951) as Stanley Briggs
The Family Secret (1951) as Joe Elsner
Red Mountain (1951) as Miles
Boots Malone (1952) as Lou Dyer (uncredited)
Hoodlum Empire (1952) as Filby — The Pickpocket (uncredited)
Skirts Ahoy! (1952) as Mr. Yarbrough (uncredited)
The Sellout (1952) as Wilfred Jackson
The Turning Point (1952) as Buck (uncredited)
Devil's Canyon (1953) as Virgil Gates
It Should Happen to You (1954) as Robert Grau
Creature from the Black Lagoon (1954) as Dr. Edwin Thompson
Riot in Cell Block 11 (1954) as Snader
The Shanghai Story (1954) as Paul Grant
The Caine Mutiny (1954) as Navy psychiatrist Lt. Commander Dickson (uncredited)
Three Hours to Kill (1954) as Deke
Target Earth (1954) as Tom, Chief research scientist
Masterson of Kansas (1954) as Joe the Poker Player winning against Doc Holliday (uncredited)
The Atomic Kid (1954) as Dr. Edgar Pangborn
The Big Combo (1955) as Doctor (scenes deleted)
Not as a Stranger (1955) as Dr. Dietrich
The Naked Street (1955) as Dist. Atty. Blaker
The Desperate Hours (1955) as FBI Agent Carson
Trial (1955) as Sam Wiltse
Shack Out on 101 (1955) as Eddie
At Gunpoint (1955) as Clem Clark
Invasion of the Body Snatchers (1956) as Dr. Hill (uncredited)
The Proud Ones (1956) as Mr. Sam Bolton
Dakota Incident (1956) as Mark Chester
Man from Del Rio (1956) as Breezy Morgan
Cheyenne The Broken Pledge — Season 2, Episode 20 (06/04/1956) as Gen. Custer (credited as Whit Bissel)
The Young Stranger (1957) as Grubbs, Theater Manager
Gunfight at the O.K. Corral (1957) as John P. Clum
I Was a Teenage Werewolf (1957) as Dr. Alfred Brandon
Johnny Tremain (1957) as Josiah Quincy
The Wayward Girl (1957) as Ira Molson
The Tall Stranger (1957) as Adam Judson
Mr. Adams and Eve (1957) as Manager (Episode: "The Business Manager")
I Was a Teenage Frankenstein (1957) as Prof. Frankenstein
Have Gun Will Travel (1957) as store owner, Mr. Jonas (Episode: No Visitors) 
Perry Mason (1957–1965) as
 Larry Sands (1957 episode The Case of the Crooked Candle)
 Max Pompey (1960 episode The Case of the Lavender Lipstick)
 Laurence Barlow (1964 episode The Case of the Nautical Knot)
 Dennison Groody (1965 episode The Case of the Carefree Coronary)
Gang War (1958) as Mark (scenes deleted)
The Defiant Ones (1958) as Lou Gans
The Black Orchid (1958) as Mr. Harmon
Monster on the Campus (1958) as Dr. Oliver Cole
No Name on the Bullet (1959) as Pierce
Warlock (1959) as Petrix
Never So Few (1959) as Capt. Alofson — Psychiatrist
The Time Machine (1960) as Walter Kemp
The Magnificent Seven (1960) as Chamlee the Undertaker
The Tom Ewell Show (1961 episode "Advice to the Lovelorn") as Harry Burton
Birdman of Alcatraz (1962) as Dr. Ellis
Hemingway's Adventures of a Young Man (1962) as Ludstrum (scenes deleted)
The Manchurian Candidate (1962) as Medical Officer (uncredited)
The Virginian (1963 episode "The Final Hour") as Burns
Spencer's Mountain (1963) as Dr. Campbell
Hud (1963) as Mr. Burris
Seven Days in May (1964) as Sen. Frederick Prentice
Advance to the Rear (1964) as Capt. Queeg
Where Love Has Gone (1964) as Professor Bell
The Hallelujah Trail (1965) as Hobbs
Fluffy (1965) as Dr. Braden
I Dream of Jeannie (1966) as Horace Sedgwick, in episode "The Fastest Gun in the East"
The Time Tunnel (1966–1967) as Lt. General Heywood Kirk 
A Covenant with Death (1967) as Bruce Donnelly
The Invaders (1967) as Col.Harris, in episode "Dark Outpost"
5 Card Stud (1968) as Dr. Cooper
Once You Kiss a Stranger (1969) as Dr. Haggis
Airport (1970) as Mr. Davidson
Justin Morgan Had a Horse (1972) as Mr. Mays
The Salzburg Connection (1972) as Jim Newhart
Pete 'n' Tillie (1972) as Minister
Soylent Green (1973) as Gov. Santini
Barnaby Jones (1973) as Mr. Bantree
Psychic Killer (1975) as Dr. Paul Taylor
Flood! (1976) as Dr. Ted Horne
The Lincoln Conspiracy (1977) as Sen. John Conness
The Last of the Mohicans (1977, TV Movie) as Gen. Webb
Casey's Shadow (1978) as Dr. Williamson
The Time Machine (1978, TV Movie) as Ralph Branly

References

External links

 
 
  (as Whitner Bissell)
 

1909 births
1996 deaths
20th-century American male actors
American male film actors
American male stage actors
American male television actors
Burials at Westwood Village Memorial Park Cemetery
Neurological disease deaths in California
Deaths from Parkinson's disease
Male Western (genre) film actors
Male actors from Los Angeles
Male actors from New York City
University of North Carolina at Chapel Hill alumni
Western (genre) television actors